The Pierre Masonic Lodge is a building in Pierre, South Dakota that was designed by architects Perkins & McWayne in Classical Revival style. The building was built in 1928 to house Pierre Lodge 27 A.F. and A.M., which formed in 1881. The building's design features a pediment at the top of the building, Ionic columns flanking the entrance, and ornamentation below the eaves. The lodge was listed on the U.S. National Register of Historic Places in 2009.

References

Neoclassical architecture in South Dakota
Masonic buildings completed in 1928
Buildings and structures in Pierre, South Dakota
Masonic buildings in South Dakota
Clubhouses on the National Register of Historic Places in South Dakota
National Register of Historic Places in Pierre, South Dakota